The Haunt of Fear was an American bi-monthly horror comic anthology series published by EC Comics, starting in 1950. Along with Tales from the Crypt and The Vault of Horror, it formed a trifecta of popular EC horror anthologies. The Haunt of Fear was sold at newsstands beginning with its May/June 1950 issue. It ceased publication with its November/December 1954 issue, compiling a total of 28 issues.

Origin
American horror comics emerged as a distinct comic book genre after World War II. At this time, US young adult males lost interest in caped crime fighters. Also, returning GIs demanded titillating sex and violence in their reading. One-shot Eerie (1947) is generally considered the first true American horror comic. Its cover depicted a dagger-wielding, red eyed ghoul who threatened a rope-bound, scantily clad, voluptuous young woman, beneath a full moon. In 1948, Adventures into the Unknown became the first regularly published horror title. It enjoyed a nearly two decade life-span. Fiction House had a regular horror series with Werewolf Hunter starting in 1943 that appeared in its comic Rangers Comics.

Features

In 1950, publisher Gaines and his editor, Al Feldstein, discovered they shared similar tastes in horror. They first began experimenting with horror tales as features in their existing titles, such as Crime Patrol, which was briefly retitled The Crypt of Terror and finally Tales from the Crypt, by which point the horror genre had become predominant. (In the early 1950s, comic book publishers, seeking to save money on second-class postage permits, frequently changed the titles of their comics, rather than start new ones at "#1"). An EC Western comic book series called Gunfighter (which itself had originated with #5, having adopted the numbering from Fat & Slat) was similarly rechristened The Haunt of Fear with issue #15. The Haunt numbering was reset after #17 (3), as explained in the letter column of issue #4: "After publishing issues 15, 16 and 17, the United States Post Office requested that the fourth issue actually be numbered No. 4 rather than No. 18... Well, 'ya can't fight City Hall!'" (The EC war comic Two-Fisted Tales took over the old Haunt numbering, starting with issue #18, and itself never ended up resetting). For this reason, even within the same original 1950s series, there are actually two separate issues each of The Haunt of Fear #15, 16, and 17.

Artists and writers
Artist Graham Ingels took over the art duties of The Haunt of Fear starting with issue #4. He became the Old Witch's primary artist for the remainder of the comic's run, though his art had been appearing since the second issue. Ingels would take over the cover duty with issue #11, in February 1952. Other artists who contributed to the title were Feldstein, Johnny Craig, Wally Wood, Harvey Kurtzman, Jack Davis, George Roussos, Harry Harrison, Joe Orlando, Sid Check, George Evans, Reed Crandall, Jack Kamen and Bernard Krigstein. Ingels' artwork on the eight page lead stories, and his splash pages, particularly on issues #14 and 17, set a new standard for horror illustration.

"Poetic Justice", in the twelfth issue, was adapted for the 1972 anthology film Tales From the Crypt from Amicus Studios, in England. The story starred Peter Cushing as a kindly old junk collector. Ingels drew "Wish You Were Here" from issue #22, which was also adapted for film. "Horror We? How's Bayou?" in issue #17 is considered to be one of E.C.'s best drawn horror stories, with the homicidal maniac's creepy visage taken from an old movie still of the silent film  Dr. Jekyll and Mr. Hyde, which starred John Barrymore. The story artwork won an award as best E.C. horror art at the 1972 E.C. Fan-Addict Convention.

Gaines and Feldstein were responsible for writing all of the stories until the end of 1953. An unauthorized adaptation of Ray Bradbury in another one of EC's comics eventually led to a series of authorized Bradbury adaptations. Features included "Grim Fairy Tales", horror based parodies of well-known fairy tales such as Sleeping Beauty and Hansel and Gretel. The parodies began appearing in issue #15, in 1952.

The title's most controversial story was "Foul Play" (#19, 1953). It was written by Feldstein and drawn by Davis. It featured a crooked baseball player being dismembered, with his body parts used to play baseball by his murderers. The story was singled out by Robert Warshow in his 1954 essay "Paul, the Horror Comics, and Dr. Wertham". He described it as "the outer limits of ... 'good taste'." It was also one of many examples used by Fredric Wertham in his book Seduction of the Innocent. Author Grant Geissman used the title of the story for his book on EC artists, Foul Play (2005).

Influences and adaptations 
As with the other EC comics edited by Feldstein, the stories in this comic were primarily based on Gaines using existing horror stories and films to develop "springboards" from which he and Feldstein could launch new stories. Specific story influences that have been identified include the following:

"The Wall" (issue 15 [1950]) – Edgar Allan Poe's "The Black Cat" and "The Tell-Tale Heart"
"Television Terror" (issue 17 [1950]) – H. Russell Wakefield's "Ghost Hunt"
"Monster Maker" (issue 17 [1950]) – James Whale's Frankenstein
"The Hunchback" (issue 4) – Robert Bloch's "The Mannikin"
"Horror in the Freak Tent" (issue 5) – Tod Browning's Freaks
"A Strange Undertaking" (issue 6) – Ray Bradbury's "The Handler"
"The Basket" (issue 7) – Robert Bloch's "The Mannikin"
"Horror in the Schoolroom" (issue 7) – John Collier's "Thus I Refute Beelzy"
"Hounded to Death" (issue 8) – Maurice Level's "The Kennel"
"Irony of Death" (issue 8) – Bram Stoker's "The Squaw"
"Warts So Horrible?" (issue 9) – Mark Twain's "The Adventures of Tom Sawyer"
"Forbidden Fruit" (issue 9) – William Hope Hodgson's "The Voice in the Night"
"The Gorilla's Paw" (issue 9) – W. W. Jacobs's "The Monkey's Paw"
"Grave Business" (issue 10) – Louis Pollock's "Breakdown"
"Ship-Shape" (issue 14) – William Hope Hodgson's "The Derelict"
"Nobody There" (issue 16) – Ralph Murphy's The Man in Half Moon Street
"Thump Fun" (issue 20) – Edgar Allan Poe's "The Tell-Tale Heart"
"Hyde and Go Shriek" (issue 20) – Robert Louis Stevenson's "Strange Case of Dr Jekyll and Mr Hyde"
"Wish You Were Here" (issue 22) – W. W. Jacobs's "The Monkey's Paw"
"Model Nephew" (issue 22) – H. P. Lovecraft's "The Terrible Old Man"

Anecdotes from Bennett Cerf's Try and Stop Me were sources for stories, including "House of Horror" (issue 15).

After their unauthorized adaptation of one of Ray Bradbury's stories in another magazine, Bradbury contacted EC about their plagiarism of his work. They reached an agreement for EC to do authorized versions of Bradbury's short fiction. These official adaptations include:

"The Coffin" (issue 16)
"The Black Ferris" (issue 18)

The Old Witch

Although EC's horror stable consisted of three separate magazines, there was little beyond their titles to distinguish them. Each magazine had its titular host, but the hosting duties for any one issue were typically shared with the hosts of the other two. Thus, a single issue of The Haunt of Fear would contain two stories told by the Old Witch, one by the Crypt-Keeper (of Tales from the Crypt) and one by the Vault-Keeper (of The Vault of Horror). The professional rivalry between these three GhoulLunatics was often played for comic effect.

The Old Witch was the last to make her appearance. The first issue of The Haunt of Fear had no host. The second issue debuted The Witch's Cauldron, a feature with the Old Witch introducing herself in a story drawn by artist Jack Kamen. The third issue featured a Craig cover depicting three GhoulLunatics stepping out of doorways and launched a letter column, "The Old Witch's Niche." Thereafter, the Old Witch presided over the magazine as its comedic horror host, delivering an irreverent and pun-filled commentary to lighten the horrific tone of the stories she introduced. In spite of her slow start, the Old Witch would prove to be the most visible of the GhoulLunatics in their initial run. Not only did she appear in virtually every issue of The Haunt of Fear, Tales From The Crypt and The Vault of Horror, she also appeared in the final story of Crime SuspenStories in every issue from #3 through #16.

The character of the Old Witch was inspired by Old Nancy, the witch of Salem, host of Alonzo Deen Cole's radio series, The Witch's Tale, which aired from 1931 to 1938 on WOR and Mutual, and in syndication.  The Old Witch's own account of her origin may be found in The Haunt of Fear #14's "A Little Stranger!" which details the circumstances surrounding her birth.

Demise

In 1954, Gaines and Feldstein intended to add a fourth book to their horror publications by reactivating an earlier title, The Crypt of Terror. They were stopped dead in their tracks, however. Horror and other violent comics had come under scrutiny by parents, schoolteachers, clergymen, psychologists and others, who viewed the material as dangerous to the well-being of children. They believed comic books were a significant contributor to the juvenile delinquency crisis in America. Matters came to a head in April and June 1954 with a highly publicized Senate Subcommittee on Juvenile Delinquency. Hearings targeted violent comic books, which fared poorly in the proceedings. While the committee stopped short of blaming the comics industry for juvenile delinquency, they did suggest it tone down the product. Publishers were left reeling.

The industry deftly avoided outside censorship by creating the self-regulatory Comics Magazine Association of America (CMAA) and a Comics Code Authority (CCA) that placed severe restrictions on violent comic book genres. Publishers were forbidden from using the words "terror" and "horror" in titles. They were forbidden from depicting zombies, werewolves, gruesome characters and outrè horror fiction trappings. Gaines was fed up; he believed his titles were being specifically targeted and realized they were doomed to future failure. He cancelled The Haunt of Fear and its companion titles in September 1954. The last issue of Haunt was #28, November/December 1954. Since an issue of The Crypt of Terror had already been produced, it was published as the final issue of Tales from the Crypt, February/March 1955.

Reprints
The Haunt of Fear has been reprinted on numerous occasions. Ballantine Books reprinted selected Haunt stories in a series of paperback EC anthologies in 1964–66. The magazine was fully collected in a series of five black-and-white hardbacks by publisher Russ Cochran as part of The Complete EC Library in 1985. In 1990/91, Cochran (in association with Gladstone Publishing and solo) reprinted a handful of color issues. Between November 1992 and August 1998,  Cochran and Gemstone Publishing reprinted the full 28 individual issues. This complete run was later rebound, with covers included, in a series of six softcover EC Annuals. Cochran Publishing and Gemstone Publishing planned to publish hardcover, re-colored volumes of The Haunt of Fear as part of the EC Archives series, until Gemstone's financial troubles left this project in limbo. But the series has since been revived by GC Press LLC, a boutique imprint established by Russ Cochran and Grant Geissman, and The Haunt of Fear Volume 1 was released in January 2012.

Media adaptations
Stories from The Haunt of Fear were adapted for the movie version of Tales From the Crypt as well as the TV series.

Stories which were adapted for the television series include: "House of Horror" (#15(1)), "Television Terror" (issue #17(3)), "Ear Today...Gone Tomorrow" (#11), "On a Dead Man's Chest" (#12), "Till Death Do We Part" (#12), "What's Cookin" (#12), "Death of Some Salesmen" (#15), "Lover Come Hack To Me" (#19), "Dig That Cat...He's Real Gone" (#21), "Creep Course" (#23), "Only Sin Deep" (#24), "The Secret" (#24), "The New Arrival" (#25), "Spoiled" (#26), "Comes The Dawn" (#26) and "About Face" (#27).

Bill Gaines owned one of sculptor Steve Fiorilla's latex masks of the Old Witch. In the second season of HBO's Tales from the Crypt anthology television series, a photo of this Old Witch mask was a prop. This was in the June 26, 1990, "Korman's Kalamity" episode, adapted from the EC story "Kamen's Kalamity." Illustrated by Jack Kamen, the original self-satirical story is set in EC's offices, where the EC editors have a meeting with Kamen about his artwork.

The Old Witch appeared in animated form on Tales from the Cryptkeeper, and was voiced by Elizabeth Hanna.

Issue guide

References

Sources
Goulart, Ron. Great American Comic Books. Publications International, Ltd., 2001. 
Overstreet, Robert M. Official Overstreet Comic Book Price Guide. House of Collectibles, 2004.

External links
Time's Richard Corliss on EC horror comics

Comics magazines published in the United States
EC Comics publications
Horror comics
Fantasy comics
1950 comics debuts
1954 comics endings
Tales from the Crypt
American comics adapted into films
Comics adapted into television series
Comics about magic
Comics by Carl Wessler
Vampires in comics
Werewolf comics
Zombies in comics